The 1969 New South Wales Rugby Football League premiership was the 62nd season of Sydney's professional rugby league football competition, Australia's first. Twelve teams, including six Sydney-based foundation teams and another six from the Sydney area competed for the J.J. Giltinan Shield and WD & HO Wills Cup during the season, which culminated in a grand final between Balmain and South Sydney.

Season summary
South Sydney fullback Eric Simms' tally of 265 points for the season from 112 goals, 19 field-goals and one try topped the season point scoring record that had been set in the 1935 season by Dave Brown.

The 1969 season's Rothmans Medallist was South Sydney's Denis Pittard.

The 1969 season also saw the retirement from the League of future Australian Rugby League Hall of Fame inductee, John Raper.

Teams

Regular season

Bold – Home game
X – Bye
Opponent for round listed above margin

Ladder

Ladder progression

Numbers highlighted in green indicate that the team finished the round inside the top 4.
Numbers highlighted in blue indicates the team finished first on the ladder in that round.
Numbers highlighted in red indicates the team finished last place on the ladder in that round.

Finals
In the preliminary final, Balmain trailed 12-14 against Manly-Warringah until late in the match when winger George Ruebner charged for the corner post to snatch a win in dramatic fashion.

Grand Final

Balmain were not given a chance of winning the Premiership after the retirement of Keith Barnes. Souths had won the last two premierships, beaten the Tigers in the major semi-final to advance to the Grand Final and boasted eleven internationals in their side.

However, as a result their favouritism Souths were overconfident and showed insufficient respect to the young Tigers, who had shown early-season form in beating them in round 1, and to their rookie coach Leo Nosworthy, who presented a well-prepared and determined Balmain team.

The Tigers led 6–0 at halftime after two penalty goals by Len Killeen and a Dave Bolton field-goal. Souths refusal to kick on the last tackle played into Balmain's hands as novice replacement hooker Peter Boulton managed to consistently regain possession from the scrums. Balmain backed up with a robust defensive line and kept South pinned in their own half.

After the break a Bob McCarthy fumble after a mix up with Paul Sait saw Bolton swoop on the ball deep in Souths territory. From the ruck Terry Parker slipped a beautiful pass to replacement winger Sid Williams who juggled but held the ball to cross the line for the only try of the match. With a 9–0 lead early in the second half and a penalty count that continued to mount in their favour, Balmain took control of the game and appeared to begin a ploy of feigning injury whenever Souths looked to build rhythm, stopping the Rabbitohs' flow of play. Hence the match is still referred to today as "the lay-down grand final".

Souths' protests proved pointless as referee Keith Page (in his first Grand Final) was powerless to stop the Tigers tactics under the rules of the day, and Balmain secured and held an 11–2 lead to win their first premiership since 1947 and to give a fairy-tale career farewell for their captain and 159-game veteran Peter Provan.

With the merging of Balmain and Western Suburbs in 1999 to become the Wests Tigers, the 1969 premiership remains the eleventh and last for the Balmain Tigers.

Balmain 11 (Tries: Williams. Goals: Killeen 2. Field Goal: D Bolton 2)

South Sydney 2 (Goals: Simms 1.)

Player statistics
The following statistics are as of the conclusion of Round 22.

Top 5 point scorers

Top 5 try scorers

Top 5 goal scorers

References

External links
 Rugby League Tables - Season 1969 The World of Rugby League
1969 Grand Final at eraofthebiff.com
Results:1961-70 at rabbitohs.com.au
1969 J J Giltinan Shield and WD & HO Wills Cup at rleague.com
NSWRFL season 1969 at rugbyleagueproject.com

New South Wales Rugby League premiership
NSWRFL season